The decade of the 1000s involved some significant events in art.

Births
 1000: Yi Yuanji – Chinese Northern Song painter famous for his realistic paintings of animals (died 1064)

Art
Years of the 11th century in art